The 2023 Latvian Higher League, known as the Optibet Virslīga for sponsorship reasons, is the 32nd season of top-tier football in Latvia. The season is set to begin on 11 March 2023 and end on 12 November 2023. Valmiera are the defending champions after winning the league the previous season.

Teams
SK Super Nova were relegated at the end of the previous season. The league consists of 9 clubs from the previous season, joined by 1 team from 1. līga - FS Jelgava, which won promotion by winning the First League in 2022.
After Spartaks Jūrmala failed to obtain the necessary license for participation in the league, SK Super Nova were given chance to return to league.

League table

Results

Rounds 1–18

Rounds 19–36

Season statistics

Top scorers

Hat-tricks

Top assists

See also
 2023 Latvian Football Cup

References

External links

Latvian Higher League seasons
1
Latvia
Latvia
Latvia